The 2023 Brisbane Broncos season is the 36th in the club's history. They will compete in the National Rugby League's 2023 Telstra Premiership. The Captain Adam Reynolds and Head Coach Kevin Walters maintain their respective club roles for the 2023 NRL Season.

Player Movement
These movements happened across the previous season, off-season and pre-season.

Gains

Losses

Pre-Season Challenge

Regular Season

2023 Squad

References

Brisbane Broncos seasons
Brisbane Broncos season
2023 NRL Women's season